The blue-billed malimbe or Gray's malimbe (Malimbus nitens) is a species of bird in the family Ploceidae.

It is found in Angola, Benin, Burkina Faso, Cameroon, Central African Republic, Republic of the Congo, Democratic Republic of the Congo, Ivory Coast, Equatorial Guinea, Gabon, Gambia, Ghana, Guinea, Guinea-Bissau, Liberia, Mali, Niger, Nigeria, Senegal, Sierra Leone, South Sudan, Togo, and Uganda.

Its natural habitat is subtropical or tropical moist lowland forests.

References

External links
 Blue-billed malimbe species text in Weaver Watch

blue-billed malimbe
Birds of Sub-Saharan Africa
blue-billed malimbe
blue-billed malimbe
Taxonomy articles created by Polbot